

Squad

On Loan

, second half of the season

Transfers

Summer

In:

Out:

Winter

In:

. 

Out:

Competitions

Azerbaijan Premier League

Results

League table

Azerbaijan Premier League Championship Group

Results

Table

Azerbaijan Cup

UEFA Champions League

Qualifying stages

UEFA Europa League

Play-off Round

Squad statistics

Appearances and goals

|-
|colspan="14"|Players who appeared for Baku who left on loan during the season:

|-
|colspan="14"|Players who appeared for Baku who left during the season:

|}

Goal scorers

Disciplinary record

References
Qarabağ have played their home games at the Tofiq Bahramov Stadium since 1993 due to the ongoing situation in Quzanlı.

FC Baku seasons
Baku